In physics, a particle is called ultrarelativistic when its speed is very close to the speed of light .

The expression for the relativistic energy of a particle with rest mass  and momentum  is given by

This can result from holding the mass fixed and increasing  to very large values (the usual case); or by holding the energy  fixed and shrinking the mass  to negligible values. The latter is used to derive orbits of massless particles such as the photon from those of massive particles (cf. Kepler problem in general relativity).

In general, the ultrarelativistic limit of an expression is the resulting simplified expression when  is assumed. Or, similarly, in the limit where the Lorentz factor  is very large.

Expression including mass value 
While it is possible to use the approximation , this neglects all information of the mass.
A simple way to retain this mass information is using a Taylor expansion rather than a simple limit. 
The following derivation assumes  (and the ultrarelativistic limit ). 
Without loss of generality, the same can be shown including the appropriate  terms.

 
 

The generic expression  can be Taylor expanded, giving:
 

Using just the first two terms, this can be substituted into the above expression (with  acting as ), as:

Ultrarelativistic approximations 
The rapidity is denoted :
 
 
 
 Motion with constant proper acceleration: , where  is the distance traveled,  is proper acceleration (with ),  is proper time, and travel starts at rest and without changing direction of acceleration (see proper acceleration for more details).

Accuracy of the approximation 

For calculations of the energy of a particle, the relative error of the ultrarelativistic limit for a speed  is about %, and for  it is just %.  For particles such as neutrinos, whose  (Lorentz factor) are usually above  ( practically indistinguishable from ), the approximation is essentially exact.

Other limits 

See also 

 Relativistic particle
 Classical mechanics
 Special relativity
 Aichelburg–Sexl ultraboost

Notes

References 

Special relativity
Approximations